Verran is a former municipality in Trøndelag county, Norway. The municipality existed from 1901 until its dissolution in 2020 when it was divided between Steinkjer Municipality and Indre Fosen Municipality. It was part of the Innherred region.  The administrative centre of the municipality was the village of Malm.  Other villages in Verran included Follafoss, Sela, Verrabotn, and Verrastranda.

At the time of its dissolution in 2020, the  municipality was the 185th largest by area out of the 422 municipalities in Norway. Verran was the 294th most populous municipality in Norway with a population of 2,473.

General information
The municipality of Verran was established on 1 January 1901 when the old municipality of Mosvik og Verran was divided into two new municipalities: Mosvik (population: 969) and Verran (population: 1,456).  During the 1960s, there were many municipal mergers across Norway due to the work of the Schei Committee.  On 1 January 1964, the neighboring municipalities of Malm (population: 2,975) to the north and Verran (population: 1,803) to the south were merged to form a new municipality of Verran.  After the merger, there were 4,778 residents in Verran.  On 1 January 1968, the Framverran area on the south side of the Verrasundet fjord (population: 395) was transferred from Verran to the neighboring municipality of Mosvik.

On 1 January 2018, the municipality switched from the old Nord-Trøndelag county to the new Trøndelag county.

On 1 January 2020 the municipality of Verran was merged with the neighboring municipality of Steinkjer to form a new, larger Steinkjer Municipality.  Also on that date, the Verrabotn area in southwestern Verran was merged with the neighboring municipality of Indre Fosen (instead of merging with Steinkjer like the rest of Verran).

Name
The municipality is named after the Verrasundet fjord, which is an arm of the great Trondheimsfjord.  The meaning of the old name is probably "the quiet one" or "the fjord with still water".

Coat of arms
The coat of arms was granted on 11 September 1987 and it was in use until 1 January 2020 when the municipality was dissolved. The official blazon is "Azure, a boat with raised square sail and topsail argent". This means the arms have a blue field (background) and the charge is a Verranjekt (boat) with a raised square sail and topsail. The boat has a tincture of argent which means it is commonly colored white, but if it is made out of metal, then silver is used. The design was chosen to symbolize the historical importance of boating and boat-building for the area. The  (literally translated as "a yacht from Verran") is a type of boat has been built in Verran for centuries. The arms were designed by Rolf Tidemann. The municipal flag has the same design as the coat of arms. After the merger of Verran and Steinkjer municipalities on 1 January 2020, these arms were adopted to represent the new Steinkjer municipality.

Churches
The Church of Norway had two parishes within the municipality of Verran. It was part of the Nord-Innherad prosti (deanery) in the Diocese of Nidaros.

Geography
Verran bordered the municipalities of Åfjord to the west, Indre Fosen to the south, Inderøy to the southeast, Steinkjer to the east, and Namdalseid to the north.  Verran encompasses the western coastline of the Beitstadfjord, an arm of the Trondheimsfjord.  There are three large lakes in Verran: Ormsetvatnet, Selavatnet, and Holden.  The river Follaelva runs through the municipality, emptying into the Trondheimsfjord at Follafoss.

Government
While it existed, this municipality was responsible for primary education (through 10th grade), outpatient health services, senior citizen services, unemployment and other social services, zoning, economic development, and municipal roads. During its existence, this municipality was governed by a municipal council of elected representatives, which in turn elected a mayor. The municipality fell under the Inntrøndelag District Court and the Frostating Court of Appeal.

Municipal council
The municipal council of Verran is made up of 19 representatives that are elected to four year terms.  The party breakdown of the final municipal council was as follows:

Mayors
The mayors of Verran:

1901–1904: Jørginus Stavrum (V)
1905–1910: Jørginus Grande (H)
1911–1928: Gunnar Aftret (V)
1928-1928: Arne Karlsen (LL)
1929–1931: John M. Viken (Ap)
1932–1934: Tomas Stavrum (LL)
1935–1942: Gunvald Engelstad (Ap)
1943–1945: Otto Sandhaug (NS)
1945-1945: Gunvald Engelstad (Ap)
1946–1947: Nils Kvam (Ap)
1948–1950: Toralf Aalberg (Ap)
1951–1953: Magne Følstad (Ap)
1954–1963: Toralf Aalberg (Ap)
1964–1971: Olav Stavrum (Ap)
1972–1979: Arthur Mogstad (Ap)
1980–1993: Rolf Ystmark (Ap)
1993–2003: Bjørn Skjelstad (Sp)
2003–2004: Kåre Olsen (Ap)
2004–2007: Robert Bjørk (Ap)
2007–2011: Frank Christiansen (Ap)
2011–2015: Bjørn Skjelstad (Sp)
2015–2019: Anders Lindstrøm (Ap)

Economy
Forestry is an important industry in Verran.  There is also a paper mill in Follafoss that is a large factory.  The paper mill is owned by Södra Cell Folla.

See also
List of former municipalities of Norway

References

External links

Municipal fact sheet from Statistics Norway 

 
Steinkjer
Indre Fosen
Former municipalities of Norway
1901 establishments in Norway
2020 disestablishments in Norway
Populated places disestablished in 2020